Space technology is technology for use in outer space, in travel (astronautics) or other activities beyond Earth's atmosphere, for purposes such as spaceflight, space exploration, and Earth observation. Space technology includes space vehicles such as spacecraft, satellites, space stations and orbital launch vehicles; deep-space communication; in-space propulsion; and a wide variety of other technologies including support infrastructure equipment, and procedures.

The space environment is a sufficiently novel environment that attempting to work in it often requires new tools and techniques.

Many common everyday services for terrestrial use such as weather forecasting, remote sensing, satellite navigation systems, satellite television, and some long-distance communications systems critically rely on space infrastructure. Of the sciences, astronomy and Earth science benefit from space technology. New technologies originating with or accelerated by space-related endeavors are often subsequently exploited in other economic activities.

History of space technology 

The first country on Earth to put any technology into space was Soviet Union, formally known as the "Union of Soviet Socialist Republics" (USSR). The USSR sent the Sputnik 1 satellite on October 4, 1957. Analysis of the radio signals was used to gather information about the electron density of the ionosphere, while temperature and pressure data was encoded in the duration of radio beeps.

The first successful human spaceflight was Vostok 1, carrying 27-year-old Soviet cosmonaut Yuri Gagarin in April 1961. The entire mission was controlled by either automatic systems or by ground control. This was because medical staff and spacecraft engineers were unsure how a human might react to weightlessness, and therefore it was decided to lock the pilot's manual controls.

The first probe to impact the surface of the Moon was the Soviet probe Luna 2, which made a hard landing on September 14, 1959. The far side of the Moon was first photographed on October 7, 1959, by the Soviet probe Luna 3.s
On December 24, 1968, the crew of Apollo 8, Frank Borman, James Lovell and William Anders, became the first human beings to enter lunar orbit and see the far side of the Moon in person. Humans first landed on the Moon on July 20, 1969. The first human to walk on the lunar surface was Neil Armstrong, commander of Apollo 11.

Apollo 11 was followed by Apollo 12, 14, 15, 16, and 17.

The first robotic lunar rover to land on the Moon was the Soviet vessel Lunokhod 1 on November 17, 1970, as part of the Lunokhod program. To date, the last human to stand on the Moon was Eugene Cernan, who as part of the Apollo 17 mission, walked on the Moon in December 1972. Apollo 17 was followed by several uncrewed interplanetary missions operated by NASA.

One of the notable interplanetary missions is Voyager 1, the first artificial object to leave the Solar System into interstellar space on August 25, 2012. It is also the most distant artificial object from Earth. The probe passed the heliopause at 121 AU to enter interstellar space. Voyager 1 is currently at a distance of  (21.708 billion kilometers; 13.489 billion miles) from Earth as of January 1, 2019.

Hazards caused by space technology

See also

 NewSpace
 Spacecraft propulsion
 Space science

References

External links

NASA images and videos of space technology
NASA solar system overview
Space-Tech: To Infinity and Beyond